The .41 Remington Magnum, also known as .41 Magnum or 10.4×33mmR (as it is known in unofficial metric designation), is a center fire firearms cartridge primarily developed for use in large-frame revolvers, introduced in 1964 by the Remington Arms Company, intended for hunting and law enforcement purposes.

Development 

In 1963, Elmer Keith and Bill Jordan, with some help from Skeeter Skelton, petitioned Smith & Wesson, Remington, and Norma to produce a pistol and ammunition in .41 caliber which would fall between the extant .357 Magnum and .44 Magnum cartridges in ballistic performance, and at the same time address perceived shortcomings with those loads. While as early as 1955 Keith had suggested a new, medium-powered ".41 Special" cartridge, this idea was passed over in favor of the higher-powered "Magnum" option, and the Special survives only as a custom wildcat cartridge, bearing roughly the same relation to the .41 Magnum as the .38 Special does to the .357 Magnum and as the .44 Special does to the .44 Magnum.

The .357 Magnum suffered from restricted terminal ballistic effectiveness in the early 1960s, as jacketed hollow point bullets were not yet commonly available, and the manufacturer's standard loadings consisted of simple lead bullets. The powerful .44 Magnum, primarily a heavy hunting round, was considered overkill for police use, generating too much recoil for control under rapid fire. In addition, the revolvers chambered for the .44 Magnum were considered too large, bulky, and heavy for police to carry.

Keith's original vision called for dual power levels in the .41, a heavy magnum load pushing a  JHP at a muzzle velocity of 1,300–1,400 feet per second (ft/s), and a milder police loading which was to send a  semiwadcutter downrange at around 900 ft/s.

These plans went awry due to an ongoing fascination in the firearms community with high-powered cartridges; Remington was swayed by this community's influence and instead of following Keith's blueprint, chose to emphasize the performance of the new cartridge. As a result, the .41 "Magnum" load was released at an advertised 1,500 ft/s, and even the "light" police loading was introduced with a 210 grain lead semiwadcutter "warmed up" to about 1,150 ft/s. However, the police load as delivered was regarded as overpowered by most law enforcement agencies, many of whom were still using .38 Special revolvers.

Additionally, Smith & Wesson had simply adapted their large N-frame revolvers for the new cartridge, which did not address size and weight concerns. The Model 58, targeted for the law enforcement market, was introduced on July 10, 1964. Weighing 41 ounces, the Model 58 compared unfavorably with other revolvers available at the time, such as Smith's own 34 ounce Model 10 in .38 Special.

These combined factors mostly eliminated the .41 Magnum from consideration for its intended market as a law enforcement firearm, although it continued to be touted as such and was adopted by a few law enforcement agencies. Ultimately, the greater round capacities of most semi-automatic, magazine fed handguns has eclipsed the traditional six-shot revolver for law enforcement work.

Smith & Wesson produced a high-end, premium revolver in .41 Magnum, the Model 57, identical to the .44 Magnum-chambered Model 29. Magnum Research's Desert Eagle division produced a .41 Magnum in their semi-automatic Mark VII. Sturm Ruger began producing their Blackhawk series single-action revolver in the mid-1960s in .41 Magnum and is still in production today.

A couple of manufacturers have produced lever-action rifles chambered in .41 Magnum.  Marlin produced four variants of its Model 1894, including the 1894S (20 in barrel, blued, straight stock), 1894FG (20 in barrel, blued, pistol-grip stock), 1894SS LTD (16 in barrel, stainless steel, straight stock) and 1894 CCL (20 in octagonal barrel, blued, straight stock.)  However, they no longer offer any model chambered for it. Henry Repeating Arms introduced a .41 Magnum variant of their Big Boy Steel model in 2016.

Market reception 
The .41 Magnum never enjoyed the popularity and success of either the .357 Magnum or .44 Magnum cartridges, but is still prized by handgun hunters as some feel it generates somewhat lighter recoil and slightly flatter bullet trajectory at long range than the .44 Magnum. Nevertheless, the .44 Magnum still catalogs a greater variety of heavier bullet weight offerings which are more effective on larger game, and boast a slight edge in power when using the heaviest factory loads, or if pushed to the edge by handloading (heavier bullets or bullets of different types).  Marshall and Sanow called the .41 Magnum "one of our most unappreciated calibers".

See also 
 .41 Special
 .41 Long Colt
 .41 Action Express
 10 mm caliber
 List of handgun cartridges
 Table of handgun and rifle cartridges

References

External links 
 Ballistics By The Inch .41mag results
 Smith & Wesson Model 657

Pistol and rifle cartridges
Remington Arms cartridges
Weapons and ammunition introduced in 1964
Magnum pistol cartridges